Egor Vadimovich Korotkov (born 14 April 1986) is a Russian freestyle skier who specializes in the skicross discipline.

Career
He finished fifth at the 2006 FIS Nordic Junior World Ski Championships, and participated in the 2007 World Championships before competing in the World Cup. He made his World Cup debut in January 2008 with a fifteenth place in Les Contamines, and followed up with an eleventh place in Kreischberg and a thirteenth place in Valmalenco before the season was over. He opened the 2008–09 season with slightly worse results.

He also competed in the 2010 Winter Olympics on the Russian ski team in ski cross.

Russian Champion (2009-2011, 2013). Bronze Medal at the Russian Championship (2012). Austrian Champion (2013). The best result is the tenth place in the  General Ski cross Championship in 2011/2012.

In ski cross at the Sochi Olympics, he took the 5th place. In the semi-final of the ski cross tournament he managed to pass through the video and photos from the finishing line.

References

External links

1986 births
Living people
People from Tryokhgorny
Russian male freestyle skiers
Olympic freestyle skiers of Russia
Freestyle skiers at the 2010 Winter Olympics
Freestyle skiers at the 2014 Winter Olympics
Freestyle skiers at the 2018 Winter Olympics
South Ural State University alumni
Sportspeople from Chelyabinsk Oblast